Deseos Y Delirios (Desires and Delusions) is a greatest hits album by Mexican recording artist Pedro Fernández, released by Universal Music Latino a division of Universal Music Latin Entertainment on November 26, 1996. Deseos Y Delirios contains a single disc with 16 songs.

Deseos Y Delirios (Sus Exitos - the successes/greatest hits) is full of traditional and romantic songs and includes the previously released multiple BMI Latin Awards winning song authored by Pedro Fernández, "Si Te Vas" (If You Go), (Si Te Vas (Pedro Fernández song)) and well-known songs such as "Si Tú Supieras" (If you knew), "Mi Forma De Sentir" (My way of feeling) and "El Sinaloense" (The Sinaloa). 

As reported by Polygram Records in the CD credit insert, "Ranchera music has acquired a new dimension in the interpretation of Pedro Fernandez. This album, in addition to previously unreleased tracks gathers the most select of the repertoire that has been recorded in his latest albums and which have sold in Latin America more than 2,000,000 copies and setting a new record for sales of Ranchera music outside our country. (Mexico)"

This album reached #2 on the Billboard Top 15 Regional Mexican Album chart January 25, 1997. The album remained in the top fifteen for 37 weeks and was at the 13th position in its final week. At the same time this album was #2, another album by Pedro, self-titled "Pedro Fernández", was at position 15 after 43 weeks reaching as high as #3 on the chart in May 1996.

Charts

Peak positions

Track listing

See also
Si Te Vas (Pedro Fernández song)

References

External links
 Pedro Fernandez – Official Website
 Pedro Fernández Music
Universal Music - Deseos Y Delirios

1996 greatest hits albums
Pedro Fernández (singer) compilation albums
Fonovisa Records compilation albums
Spanish-language compilation albums